Alex Foster (born 25 September 1993) is an English professional rugby league footballer who plays as a  or  for Newcastle Thunder in the RFL Championship.

He has previously played for the Leeds Rhinos in the Super League, as well as playing on loan from Leeds at the Hunslet Hawks, London Broncos and Featherstone Rovers. He spent the 2016 with the Broncos in the Kingstone Press Championship before returning to the top flight with the Castleford Tigers. He spent time on loan from the Tigers at Oxford in 2017 and Halifax in 2018.

Background
Foster was born in Gloucester, Gloucestershire, England.

Playing career

Leeds Rhinos
Foster débuted in the Super League with the Leeds Rhinos during the 2013 season. At the end of the season, he signed a 3-year deal with Leeds Rhinos. In 2014, Foster made nine appearances with the Leeds Rhinos.

In the 2014 season, he made 14 appearances and scored 3 tries. He has been playing as a second-row with Matt Cook. On 25 May 2014 against Hull Kingston Rovers at Craven Park, Hull, Foster scored 2 tries in a 48-16 defeat.

London Broncos

After a spell with Featherstone Rovers, Foster signed for London on a 2-year deal. Injury meant that he was restricted to 20 appearances for the Broncos.

Bradford Bulls
In 2017, Foster agreed a deal with Bradford however the club went into liquidation and Foster was released.

Castleford Tigers
In February 2017, Castleford head coach Daryl Powell confirmed that Foster had been offered a trial with the view of a 2-year deal at the end of the trial. In April, it was confirmed Foster signed a deal until the end of the season with Cas (Heritage № 975) and was given the number 34 shirt. In July, it was confirmed that Foster had signed a new deal. On signing the new deal, he said, "I'm over the moon to sign here for another two years. It's a great place to be." Foster was a replacement for Cas in the 2017 Grand Final and scored their only try of the game, becoming the first Castleford player to score in a Super League Grand Final.

Foster demonstrated his positional versatility in 2018, starting at prop, loose forward, second row and centre at different points throughout the season. He was rewarded for his impressive form in June with a new three-and-a-half-year contract. However, in July, Foster was ruled out for the remainder of the season due to a foot injury.

In the 2019 season, Foster made 6 appearances and scored 1 try. His playtime was limited by a knee injury sustained in March, for which he underwent surgery later in the year. Foster made his return to the team following the 2020 season's Covid-19 suspension, after spending 16 months on the sidelines. In the remainder of the season, he made 8 appearances and scored 1 try.

Foster sustained a bicep injury in a pre-season friendly against Hull KR in March 2021. He made his first appearance of the year in Castleford's Challenge Cup semi-final against Warrington on 5 June. On 17 July 2021, he played for Castleford in their 2021 Challenge Cup Final loss against St. Helens. In September, it was announced that he would leave the club at the end of the 2021 season upon the expiry of his contract. Speaking about his time at Castleford, Foster said, "It has been one hell of a journey and I am so thankful to everyone involved, from the coaching staff to the fans, my teammates as well who have made my time here what it has been for me."

Newcastle Thunder
On 17 Oct 2021, it was reported that he had signed for Newcastle Thunder in the RFL Championship on a two-year deal. He made his first appearance and scored his first try for the club against Workington on 30 January.

Club statistics

(* denotes season still competing)

References

Further reading

External links

Castleford Tigers profile
SL profile
London Broncos profile

1993 births
Living people
Castleford Tigers players
English rugby league players
Featherstone Rovers players
Halifax R.L.F.C. players
Hunslet R.L.F.C. players
Leeds Rhinos players
London Broncos players
Newcastle Thunder captains
Newcastle Thunder players
Oxford Rugby League players
Rugby league players from Gloucestershire
Rugby league second-rows